The Egyptian Theatre is a theatre and concert venue in the western United States, located in Boise, Idaho. It has also been known as the Ada Theater (Boise is the seat of Ada County). Inaugurated  in 1927, it is the oldest theatre in the city. When it opened, the local press wrote that it "embodies the characteristic features of the land of the Nile, from the truncated pyramids which form the great pylons, to the lotus bud pillars with their ornate frescoes." The great lotus pillars flanking the screen are based on those of Karnak. The theatre has been renovated by Conrad Schmitt Studios.

History
The Egyptian Theatre was designed by Frederick C. Hummel of the architectural firm Tourtellotte & Hummel.

The theater's architecture is of the Egyptian revival style, inspired by the newly discovered tomb of King Tut. Over time, the structure underwent various changes. In 1999, it was remodeled once again after the original building.

It was listed on the National Register of Historic Places in 1974.

The theater is architecturally significant as one of the few surviving theaters from the grand cinema and movie palace era in Boise.

The Bourne Identity, The Bourne Supremacy, and The Bourne Ultimatum film premieres were all hosted at The Egyptian Theatre.

Actor Aaron Paul rented out the Egyptian theater in downtown Boise to live stream the 14th episode of Breaking Bad.

The Egyptian Theatre is home to performances by Opera Idaho.

References

External links 

Boise Classic Movies

Egyptian-style theaters
Theatres completed in 1927
Theatres on the National Register of Historic Places in Idaho
Buildings and structures in Boise, Idaho
Cinemas and movie theaters in Idaho
Opera houses in Idaho
Egyptian Revival architecture in the United States
Historic American Buildings Survey in Idaho
National Register of Historic Places in Boise, Idaho